Half Angel is a 1951 Technicolor comedy directed by Richard Sale, starring Loretta Young, Joseph Cotten, and Cecil Kellaway. Nora Gilpin (Young), a prim and proper nurse, is engaged to the stuffy Tim (John Ridgely). Unknown to both, Nora is a sleepwalker; during her nocturnal forays, the less-inhibited side of her personality takes over.

Plot
No-nonsense nurse Nora Gilpin  (Young) does not care much for John Raymond Jr. (Cotten), a famous, rich lawyer. Her immediate plans are to marry Tim McCarey (Ridgely), a building contractor, and settle down to a nice, normal life.

That night, a sleepwalking Nora slips into a provocative dress and goes to the home of a startled John, behaving seductively. She does not reveal her name and he cannot figure out where they have met. They spend several hours together, but she then gets away before John notices.

John spots her on the street one day and excitedly brings up their evening together, but Nora has no idea what he is talking about and is greatly embarrassed, because this happens in front of Tim. She tells John he has misidentified her, and they rush away, leaving John confused.

Later, as John is leaving by train on a business trip, Nora pops up again, playfully enticing him and then cavorting with him for hours at an amusement park, until the wee hours of the morning.

Dr. Jackson (Basil Ruysdael) is consulted about sleepwalking and thinks Nora's behavior must stem from something in her past. John realizes that he knew her many years ago as the gardener's daughter, but Nora adamantly denies it, continuing to prepare for her wedding day.

She packs a suitcase for her honeymoon, but that night, while John waits outside, sure enough, Nora appears again. He rushes her to a justice of the peace and they are married. She wakes up the next morning (with John in the adjoining bed) in a motel. Surprised, embarrassed, and unnerved, she hurries to her wedding (with Tim), only to have John interrupt the ceremony by claiming she is already married. Nora faints, but comes to and finally realizes whom she truly loves.

Cast
 Loretta Young as Nora Gilpin  (Singing voice dubbed by Martha Mears)
 Joseph Cotten as John Raymond Jr.  
 Cecil Kellaway as Harry Gilpin  
 Basil Ruysdael as Dr. Jackson  
 Jim Backus as Michael 'Mike' Hogan  
 Irene Ryan as Nurse Kay  
 John Ridgely as Timothy 'Tim' McCarey

References

External links 
 
 
 
 

1951 films
1951 comedy films
American comedy films
Films about sexual repression
Films directed by Richard Sale
20th Century Fox films
Films with screenplays by Robert Riskin
Films scored by Cyril J. Mockridge
1950s English-language films
1950s American films